Margus was an ancient Roman city situated at locality of present-day Požarevac (Serbia). Latin name Margus was in use after the Roman conquest in the first century BC. Before the Roman conquest, the area was inhabited by Thracians, Dacians and Celts. Nearby Viminacium was the provincial capital of Moesia Superior, of which Margus was part. 

In 435, the city of Margus, under the Eastern Roman Empire, was the site of a treaty between the Byzantine Empire and the Hun leaders Attila and Bleda. One pretext for the Hun invasion of the Eastern Roman Empire in 442 was that the Bishop of Margus had crossed the Danube to ransack and desecrate the royal Hun graves on the north bank of the Danube. When the Romans discussed handing over the Bishop, he slipped away and betrayed the city to the Huns, who then sacked the city and went on to invade as far as the gates of Constantinople itself.

See also
 Battle of the Margus

References

Roman towns and cities in Serbia
Moesia